Milko Djurovski (born 26 January 1963) is a Macedonian former professional footballer and manager. He was regarded as one of the most talented Yugoslav players of his generation.

Djurovski started out at Red Star Belgrade, making his senior debut in 1979, aged 16. He spent a total of seven seasons in their first team, winning two national championships (1981 and 1984) and two national cups (1982 and 1985). In the summer of 1986, Djurovski made a surprising and controversial move to Red Star's bitter rivals Partizan. He stayed for four years at Stadion JNA, including an inactive season because of his compulsory military service. Some of his most memorable performances with the Crno-beli include a 1989–90 European Cup Winners' Cup tie against Groningen, which eventually secured him a transfer to the Dutch club in 1990. In his later years, Djurovski went on to play for several Slovenian clubs.

Internationally, Djurovski represented both Yugoslavia and Macedonia. He earned six caps for Yugoslavia between 1984 and 1985, scoring two goals. After the dissolution of the former country, Djurovski briefly played for his native Macedonia, making three appearances in 1994. He had previously won the bronze medal for Yugoslavia at the 1984 Summer Olympics.

His older brother is Boško Djurovski, while his younger son is Mario Gjurovski.

Club career
Born in Tetovo, Djurovski joined the youth categories of his hometown club Teteks. He subsequently moved to Red Star Belgrade in 1977. Still a junior, Djurovski made his senior debut for the club on 11 April 1979, coming on as a substitute for Duško Lukić in the first leg of the UEFA Cup semi-final, a 1–0 win over Hertha BSC. He spent the following 1979–80 season on loan at Čukarički, becoming the Serbian League (Group North) top scorer with 15 goals. After returning from a loan spell, Djurovski helped Red Star win the Yugoslav First League in the 1980–81 campaign, scoring five goals in the process. He was an integral part of the team and a fan favorite in the following years, leading them to another league title in 1984.

In the summer of 1986, Djurovski switched to Partizan in a move that caused much controversy among fans and the general public. He immediately established himself as the club's key player, being their top scorer in the 1986–87 season, as Partizan won the league title. Afterwards, Djurovski spent the following three seasons with the Crno-beli, including one year of his military service.

In the summer of 1990, Djurovski moved abroad and signed with Dutch club Groningen. He was the club's top league scorer in his debut season at Oosterpark with 14 goals, leading them to a third place, behind PSV and Ajax. In the following 1991–92 season, Djurovski again helped the club to secure a spot in the UEFA Cup. He was then loaned to fellow Eredivisie club Cambuur in 1993. After returning to Groningen, Djurovski spent another few months at the club, before eventually leaving the country in the winter of 1994.

After leaving Groningen, Djurovski moved to the newly independent Slovenia and signed with Maribor in early 1994. He later moved to French side Nîmes, but left the club after only a few games in December 1994. Later on, Djurovski made a return to Slovenia and joined Second League club Železničar Maribor in the summer of 1995. He then moved to the United States and briefly played indoor soccer for the Kansas City Attack in 1998, alongside his former Partizan teammate Nebojša Vučićević.

In the early 2000s, Djurovski came out of retirement and went on to play for Slovenian Third League clubs Rogoza, Bistrica (twice), and Malečnik. He then served as player-manager of Bosnian club Rudar Prijedor in 2003. Afterwards, Djurovski made two appearances for Ljubljana in the First League, before the club dissolved at the end of the 2004–05 season. He later served as player-manager of Malečnik, before joining newly formed Slovenian club Bežigrad in July 2005. Djurovski appeared in a couple of matches for the club, before definitely retiring from the game, aged 42.

International career
Djurovski made his full international debut for Yugoslavia on 31 March 1984, coming on as a substitute for Miloš Šestić and scoring the game's opener in a 2–1 friendly win over Hungary. He subsequently represented the country at the 1984 Summer Olympics, as the team won the bronze medal, defeating Italy in the third place match. In 1985, Djurovski made five more appearances for the senior team and scored once.

In 1994, Djurovski accepted a call-up to represent the country of his birth. He made his senior debut for Macedonia in an October 1994 European Championship qualification match against Spain in Skopje and earned a total of 3 caps, scoring no goals. His final international was a December 1994 European Championship qualification match against Cyprus.

Managerial career
After his stint at Železničar Maribor as a player, Djurovski was appointed manager of the club ahead of the 1998–99 season. He was eventually unable to perform his function due to the problems with his license.

In October 2005, Djurovski was appointed manager of Drava Ptuj. He left the club in July 2006. Shortly after, Djurovski was appointed manager of Nafta Lendava. He left them in August 2007. Two weeks later, Djurovski became manager of his former club Maribor, penning a two-year deal. He was released on 5 November 2007. In October 2008, Djurovski returned to his native country, being named manager of Vardar. He left the club in January 2009. Later that year, Djurovski served as manager of fellow Macedonian club Belasica.

Subsequently, Djurovski returned to Slovenia and took charge at Drava Ptuj for the second time, before leaving the position in April 2010. He also served as manager of Austrian club Pöllau in 2012. In June 2015, Djurovski was appointed manager of Slovakian club Zlaté Moravce. He once again returned to Slovenia and took charge at Zavrč in October 2015. In March 2016, Djurovski became manager of Bosnian club Slavija Sarajevo. He left the club only two months later after failing to avoid relegation from the top flight.

Personal life
Djurovski has two sons, Marko Djurovski (b. 1983), an RnB singer, and Mario Djurovski (b. 1985), a professional footballer. He is also the younger brother of Boško Djurovski. They played together at both club and international level.

Career statistics

Club

International

Honours

Player
Red Star Belgrade
Yugoslav First League: 1980–81, 1983–84
Yugoslav Cup: 1981–82, 1984–85

Partizan
Yugoslav First League: 1986–87
Yugoslav Cup: 1988–89
Yugoslav Super Cup: 1989–90

Yugoslavia
Olympic Games: Bronze Medal 1984

References

External links

Profile at MacedonianFootball.com 
Milko Djurovski at PrvaLiga

1963 births
Living people
Sportspeople from Tetovo
Association football forwards
Yugoslav footballers
Yugoslavia international footballers
Olympic bronze medalists for Yugoslavia
Olympic footballers of Yugoslavia
Olympic medalists in football
Footballers at the 1984 Summer Olympics
Macedonian footballers
North Macedonia international footballers
Dual internationalists (football)
Red Star Belgrade footballers
FK Čukarički players
FK Partizan players
FC Groningen players
SC Cambuur players
NK Maribor players
Nîmes Olympique players
NK Železničar Maribor players
Kansas City Attack (NPSL) players
FK Rudar Prijedor players
NK Ljubljana players
Yugoslav First League players
Eredivisie players
Slovenian PrvaLiga players
Ligue 2 players
National Professional Soccer League (1984–2001) players
Yugoslav expatriate footballers
Macedonian expatriate footballers
Expatriate footballers in the Netherlands
Yugoslav expatriate sportspeople in the Netherlands
Macedonian expatriate sportspeople in the Netherlands
Expatriate footballers in Slovenia
Macedonian expatriate sportspeople in Slovenia
Expatriate footballers in France
Macedonian expatriate sportspeople in France
Expatriate soccer players in the United States
Macedonian expatriate sportspeople in the United States
Expatriate footballers in Bosnia and Herzegovina
Macedonian expatriate sportspeople in Bosnia and Herzegovina
Macedonian football managers
NK Maribor managers
FK Vardar managers
FK Belasica managers
FK Jedinstvo Brčko managers
FC ViOn Zlaté Moravce managers
FK Slavija Sarajevo managers
Macedonian expatriate football managers
Expatriate football managers in Slovenia
Expatriate football managers in Bosnia and Herzegovina
Expatriate football managers in Austria
Macedonian expatriate sportspeople in Austria
Expatriate football managers in Slovakia
Macedonian expatriate sportspeople in Slovakia
Medalists at the 1984 Summer Olympics